Ilyas Mahammad oglu Afandiyev was an Azerbaijani and Soviet writer, member of Azerbaijan Union of Writers (1940), Honored Art Worker of Azerbaijan (1960), laureate of the State Prize of Azerbaijan (1972) and People’s Writer of Azerbaijan (1979).

Biography
Ilyas Afandiyev was born on 26 May 1914 in Karyagino, Russian Empire (now Fuzuli District, Azerbaijan). In 1938, he graduated from the Lenin Azerbaijan State Pedagogical Institute in Baku. In 1939, his “Letters from the village” collection was published. In 1945, his “Serene nights” collection of stories was published. The collections are dedicated to the Soviet intelligentsia. Afandiyev was also noted as a playwright covering psychological themes which are still performed. He was the author of novels, sketches and literary-critical articles.

Afandiyev died on 3 October 1996 in Baku and was buried in the city's Alley of Honor.

Works

Plays
 Expectation (1940)
 Bright ways (1947)
 Spring floods (1948)
 The Atayevs’ family (1954)
 You are always with me (1965)
 My guilt (1969)
 A devil came from a fiery desert 
 A chandelier for ten mantas
 Believe in us
 I can’t forget (1968)
 Erased diaries (1970)
 The song stayed in the mountains (1971)
 Weird boy (1973)
 Voice coming from the gardens (1976)
 Khurshidbanu Natavan (1980)
 In the crystal palace 
 Shaikh Khiyabani (1986)
 Our strange destiny (1988)
 Sweethearts coupling in the hell (1989)
 A single oleaster tree (1991)
 Sensible and mad men (1992)
 The ruler and a girl (1994)

Novels
 Willow channel (1958)
 Cornel bridge (1960)
 Three friends beyond mountains (1964)
 Plane tree of khan 
 Fairy tale of bulbul and Valeh (1976-1978)
 Old man, don’t look back (1980)

References 

1914 births
1996 deaths
Azerbaijani writers
Azerbaijani literary critics
Soviet writers